Andrew Kasarskis (born November 2, 1972) is an American biologist. He is the Chief Data Officer (CDO) at Sema4. He was previously CDO and an Executive Vice President (EVP) at the Mount Sinai Health System in New York City and, before that, vice chair of the Department of Genetics and Genomic Sciences and Co-director of the Icahn Institute for Genomics and Multiscale Biology at the Icahn School of Medicine at Mount Sinai. Kasarskis is known for taking a network-based approach to biology and for directing the first medical school class offering students the opportunity to fully sequence and analyze their own genomes.

Early life and education 

Kasarskis completed bachelor's degrees in chemistry and biology at the University of Kentucky in 1992. In 1998, he completed his PhD in molecular and cell biology at the University of California, Berkeley, under the supervision of Kathryn Anderson.

Career and research 

Throughout his career in industry and academia, Kasarskis' research has focused on the use of genetic and genomic data together with high-performance computing and advanced analytical tools to address biomedical needs and improve clinical treatment.

After completing his PhD in 1998, Kasarskis worked at Stanford University for two years, contributing to the development of various genome databases. In 2000, he entered industry, working in computational biology at DoubleTwist and later Rosetta Inpharmatics (acquired by Merck Research Laboratories). His work there centered on generating and mining complex biological data sets and using that information to build, predict, and model human disease. Kasarskis also worked for Sage Bionetworks and Pacific Biosciences before returning to academia.

In 2011, Kasarskis became Vice Chair of the Department of Genetics and Genomic Sciences at the Icahn School of Medicine at Mount Sinai and Co-director, along with Eric Schadt, of the Icahn Institute for Genomics and Multiscale Biology, where Kasarskis's research focuses on improving health outcomes through better data mining, and his research program includes sequencing-based pathogen surveillance; pharmacogenomics; electronic health records; and systems biology of sleep, behavior, and stress. In 2019, Kasarskis was appointed Chief Data Officer and Executive Vice President of Mount Sinai Health System, where he leads efforts to improve clinical data infrastructure and leverage data to improve patient outcomes while accelerating research and innovation.

Kasarskis is known for directing the first graduate course that allowed medical and PhD students to fully sequence and analyze their own genomes, along with co-instructors Michael Linderman, George Diaz, Ali Bashir, and Randi Zinberg. He has said that courses like this will be critical for training teams of people capable of performing this type of analysis in a medical setting. He chose whole genome sequencing because he expects the more limited exome sequencing will not be a relevant technological approach in the long term.

Kasarskis has called for improvements to informed consent protocols in patient research based on the concept that studies involving DNA cannot fully be made anonymous. He was quoted in the journal Nature saying, "We need to move beyond an assumption that you cannot be identified from the data that exist about you and really work to make sure that we're protecting people's rights in ways that allow us to use the data that are out there for individuals' and researchers' benefit."

In 2019, Kasarskis joined a five-year collaborative study with Mount Sinai Health System, Sanofi, and Sema4, aimed to provide insights into the biological mechanisms of asthma using diverse data sets such as clinical data, genomics, immunological environmental, and sensor data from devices to carryout advanced network modeling of the disease. Kasarskis reported that understanding the molecular basis of clinical subtypes of asthma in the study would enable better management of asthma and could provide opportunities to discover new treatments for the disease.  

In 2020, the molecular pathogen surveillance program Kasarskis had established with Dr. Harm van Bakel and others at the Mount Sinai Health System clearly demonstrated that SARS-CoV2, the virus causing COVID-19, was introduced to the New York Metropolitan Area not from Asia but predominately from Europe, with some contribution from other United States regions. The ensuing research paper was published in the journal Science.

Selected publications

Pharmacogenomics

Pathogens

Complex disease

References 

Living people
1972 births
University of California, Berkeley alumni
University of Kentucky alumni
Icahn School of Medicine at Mount Sinai faculty
21st-century American biologists